Calycadenia multiglandulosa is a species of flowering plant in the family Asteraceae, known by the common names sticky calycadenia and sticky western rosinweed. It is endemic to California, where it is a common in the Coast Ranges and in the Sierra Nevada Foothills from Shasta County to Kern County.

Description
This is an annual herb producing an erect, hairy, glandular stem up to 70 centimeters (28 inches) tall. The leaves are linear in shape and up to 8 centimeters long. The inflorescence is a series of dense clusters of flower heads surrounded by long, narrow bracts covered in obvious bulbous glands. The sticky, glandular flower head has a center of several disc florets surrounded by a few white, yellow, or red ray florets. Each ray floret has three lobes at the tip, the middle lobe being shortest. The fruit is an achene; those developing from the disc florets have a pappus of scales.

References

External links
NatureServe (2013):Calycadenia multiglandulosa
Calycadenia multiglandulosa — Calphotos  Photo gallery, University of California

multiglandulosa
Endemic flora of California
Flora of the Sierra Nevada (United States)
Natural history of the California chaparral and woodlands
Natural history of the California Coast Ranges
Natural history of the Central Valley (California)
Natural history of the San Francisco Bay Area
Plants described in 1836